Capital Cities Communications v. CRTC (1977), [1978] 2 S.C.R. 141 is a Supreme Court of Canada decision on the legislative jurisdiction of cable television. Chief Justice Laskin, writing for the majority of the Court, held that all television, even where exclusively produced and distributed within the province, fell within the definition of a federal undertaking under section 92(10)(a) of the Constitution Act, 1867.

Rogers Cable provided a subscription service for American television programs. The Canadian Radio-television and Telecommunications Commission (at the time of the decision recently renamed from the Canadian Radio-Television Commission, in both cases abbreviated CRTC), a federal regulatory agency, required television broadcasters such as Rogers to remove the commercials from American television feeds and replace them with Canadian ads (simultaneous substitution). Capital Cities Communications at the time owned WKBW-TV, a station based in Buffalo, New York that had a strong following in the province of Ontario. The then-owners of fellow Buffalo stations WGR-TV and WBEN-TV joined Capital Cities in the suit.

The issue before the Court was whether the federal government had legislative jurisdiction over the content of cable television.

Laskin held that both cable and broadcast television were both within the jurisdiction of the federal government.

This decision was released along with the accompanying case Dionne v. Quebec (Public Service Board) [1978] 2 S.C.R. 191.

See also
 List of Supreme Court of Canada cases (Laskin Court)

External links
 Full text from Canlii.org and lexum

Supreme Court of Canada cases
Canadian federalism case law
Mass media regulation in Canada
Rogers Communications
Canadian Radio-television and Telecommunications Commission
1977 in Canadian case law